The 1961 Tulsa Golden Hurricane football team represented the University of Tulsa during the 1961 NCAA University Division football season. In their first year under head coach Glenn Dobbs, the Golden Hurricane compiled a 2–8 record (1–2 against Missouri Valley Conference opponents) and finished in last place in the conference. The team's statistical leaders included Ronnie Sine with 512 passing yards, David White with 293 rushing yards, and Max Letterman with 277 receiving yards.

Schedule

References

Tulsa
Tulsa Golden Hurricane football seasons
Tulsa Golden Hurricane football